This was the first of seven editions of the tournament in the 2021 tennis season.

Unseeded Illya Marchenko won the title after defeating the top seed Andy Murray 6–2, 6–4 in the final.

Seeds

Draw

Finals

Top half

Bottom half

References

External links
Main draw
Qualifying draw

Biella Challenger Indoor - 1